The New South Wales PGA Championship was a professional golf tournament played in New South Wales, Australia between 1923 and 2015.

History 
The inaugural event was held in 1923 and was won by Fred Popplewell with a score of 311. Dan Soutar had led by two strokes after the first 36 holes at The Australian Golf Club but Popplewell took a three shot lead after a third round of 74 and held on in the final round to win by a stroke. The final 36 holes were played at Royal Sydney. It was a stroke-play event again in 1924 but thereafter it was generally match-play until World War II. After the war it was a match play event in 1946 and 1950 but otherwise it was a stroke-play tournament.

From the early 1980s the event was not played as a separate event, being incorporated into other tournaments. Later it was played as a non-tour event or as part of a second-tier tour. It became a PGA Tour of Australasia event from 2009 until 2015, except for 2013 when it was not played, but has not been held since.

Kel Nagle won the event 7 times while Eric Cremin won it 5 times.

Winners

Notes

References

External links
Coverage on the PGA Tour of Australasia's official site
List of winners

Former PGA Tour of Australasia events
Golf tournaments in Australia
Golf in New South Wales
Recurring sporting events established in 1923
Recurring sporting events disestablished in 2015